Surti Kistaiya (1 May 1923 – 22 October 1999) was an Indian politician. He was elected to the Lok Sabha, the lower house of the Parliament of India from Bastar,  Madhya Pradesh as a member of the Indian National Congress. Kistaiya died in Madhya Pradesh on 22 October 1999, at the age of 76.

References

External links
  Official biographical sketch on the Parliament of India website

1923 births
1999 deaths
India MPs 1957–1962
Indian National Congress politicians
Lok Sabha members from Madhya Pradesh